There are at least 23 named lakes and reservoirs in Polk County, Arkansas.

Lakes
 Shady Lake, el.

Reservoirs
Aeration Lake, el.  
Bethesda Lake, el.  
Polk County, el.  
Brewer Lake, el.  
City of Mena Sewage Logoon, el.  
Cox Lake, el.  
Dairy Lake, el.  
Faulkner Lake, el.  
Forbis Lake, el.  
Hillcrest Lake, el.  
Irons Fork Reservoir, el.  
Ivey Lake, el.  
J and B Lake, el.  
Jenkins Lake, el.  
Lake Wilhelmina, el.  
Mena Lake, el.  
Multipurpose Site One Reservoir, el.  
Patchett Lake, el.  
Powell Lake, el.  
Reeds Lake, el.  
Shady Lake, el.  
Ward Lake, el.

See also
 List of lakes in Arkansas

Notes

Bodies of water of Polk County, Arkansas
Polk